Chayuco-Jamiltepec Mixtec is a Mixtec language of Oaxaca, spoken in the towns of San Agustín Chayuco, Santa Catarina Mechoacán, Santiago Jamiltepec, San Andrés Huaxpaltepec, Santa María Huazolotitlán, Santiago Tetepec, and Santa Elena Comaltepec.

References

External links 

Jamiltepec Mixtec publications online, Summer Institute of Linguistics
OLAC resources in and about the Jamiltepec Mixtec language
OLAC resources in and about the Chayuco Mixtec language

Mixtec language